Homity pie is a traditional British open vegetable pie. The pastry case contains a filling of potatoes and an  onion and leek mixture, which is then covered with cheese.

There is little known on the exact history of the dish. Some call it 'Devon Pie', believing it to be an English country recipe originating from Devon. Its origins are also claimed to date back to the Women's Land Army of the Second World War and the restrictions imposed by wartime rationing. What is known however is that the dish's mainstream popularity came from Cranks Vegetarian Restaurant, which opened in London in 1961, when vegetarianism gained support from the hippie subculture.

See also
 List of pies, tarts and flans

References

External links
 How to make to Homity Pie
 Homity Pie (British cheesy potato leek pie)

British pies
English cuisine
Savoury pies
Leek dishes
Potato dishes
Cheese dishes